This is a list of the bird species recorded in Taiwan. The avifauna of Taiwan include a total of 698 species, of which 30 are endemic, and 16 have been introduced by humans. Of these, 43 species are globally threatened.

This list's taxonomic treatment (designation and sequence of orders, families and species) and nomenclature (common and scientific names) follow the conventions of The Clements Checklist of Birds of the World, 2022 edition. The family accounts at the beginning of each heading reflect this taxonomy, as do the species counts found in each family account. Introduced and accidental species are included in the total counts for Taiwan.

The following tags have been used to highlight several categories. The commonly occurring native species do not fall into any of these categories.

(A) Accidental - a species that rarely or accidentally occurs in Taiwan
(E) Endemic - a species endemic to Taiwan
(I) Introduced - a species introduced to Taiwan as a consequence, direct or indirect, of human actions

Ducks, geese, and waterfowl
Order: AnseriformesFamily: Anatidae

Anatidae includes the ducks and most duck-like waterfowl, such as geese and swans. These birds are adapted to an aquatic existence with webbed feet, flattened bills, and feathers that are excellent at shedding water due to an oily coating.

Lesser whistling-duck, Dendrocygna javanica (A)
Bar-headed goose, Anser indicus (A)
Graylag goose, Anser anser
Swan goose, Anser cygnoides
Greater white-fronted goose, Anser albifrons
Lesser white-fronted goose, Anser erythropus
Taiga bean-goose, Anser fabalis
Tundra bean-goose, Anser serrirostris
Brant, Branta bernicla
Cackling goose, Branta hutchinsii (A)
Mute swan, Cygnus olor (A)
Tundra swan, Cygnus columbianus
Whooper swan, Cygnus cygnus (A)
Ruddy shelduck, Tadorna ferruginea (A)
Common shelduck, Tadorna tadorna
Cotton pygmy-goose, Nettapus coromandelianus (A)
Mandarin duck, Aix galericulata
Baikal teal, Sibirionetta formosa (A)
Garganey, Spatula querquedula
Northern shoveler, Spatula clypeata
Gadwall, Mareca strepera
Falcated duck, Mareca falcata
Eurasian wigeon, Mareca penelope
American wigeon, Mareca americana
Philippine duck, Anas luzonica (A)
Eastern spot-billed duck, Anas zonorhyncha
Mallard, Anas platyrhynchos
Northern pintail, Anas acuta
Green-winged teal, Anas crecca
Red-crested pochard, Netta rufina (A)
Canvasback, Aythya valisineria
Common pochard, Aythya ferina (A)
Ring-necked duck, Aythya collaris (A)
Ferruginous duck, Aythya nyroca (A)
Baer's pochard, Aythya baeri
Tufted duck, Aythya fuligula
Greater scaup, Aythya marila
Lesser scaup, Aythya affinis (A)
Long-tailed duck, Clangula hyemalis (A)
Common goldeneye, Bucephala clangula (A)
Smew, Mergellus albellus
Common merganser, Mergus merganser (A)
Red-breasted merganser, Mergus serrator
Scaly-sided merganser, Mergus squamatus (A)

Pheasants, grouse, and allies
Order: GalliformesFamily: Phasianidae

The Phasianidae are a family of terrestrial birds. In general, they are plump (although they vary in size) and have broad, relatively short wings. 

Taiwan partridge, Arborophila crudigularis (E)
Mikado pheasant, Syrmaticus mikado (E)
Ring-necked pheasant, Phasianus colchicus
Swinhoe's pheasant, Lophura swinhoii (E)
Taiwan bamboo-partridge, Bambusicola sonorivox (E)
Blue-breasted quail, Synoicus chinensis
Japanese quail, Coturnix japonica

Flamingos
Order: PhoenicopteriformesFamily: Phoenicopteridae

Flamingos filter-feed on shellfish and algae. Their oddly shaped beaks are specially adapted to separate mud and silt from the food they consume and, uniquely, are used upside-down.

Greater flamingo, Phoenicopterus roseus (I)

Grebes
Order: PodicipediformesFamily: Podicipedidae

Grebes are small to medium-large freshwater diving birds. They have lobed toes and are excellent swimmers and divers. However, they have their feet placed far back on the body, making them quite ungainly on land.

Little grebe, Tachybaptus ruficollis
Horned grebe, Podiceps auritus
Red-necked grebe, Podiceps grisegena (A)
Great crested grebe, Podiceps cristatus
Eared grebe, Podiceps nigricollis

Pigeons and doves
Order: ColumbiformesFamily: Columbidae

Pigeons and doves are stout-bodied birds with short necks and short slender bills with a fleshy cere. There are 308 species worldwide and 12 species which occur in Taiwan.

Rock pigeon, Columba livia (I)
Ashy wood-pigeon, Columba pulchricollis
Japanese wood-pigeon, Columba janthina
Metallic pigeon, Columba vitiensis (A)
Oriental turtle-dove, Streptopelia orientalis
Eurasian collared-dove, Streptopelia decaocto (I)
Red collared-dove, Streptopelia tranquebarica
Spotted dove, Streptopelia chinensis
Barred cuckoo-dove, Macropygia unchall (A)
Philippine cuckoo-dove, Macropygia tenuirostris
Asian emerald dove, Chalcophaps indica
Orange-breasted green-pigeon, Treron bicincta (A)
Thick-billed green-pigeon, Treron curvirostra (A)
White-bellied green-pigeon, Treron sieboldii
Whistling green-pigeon, Treron formosae
Black-chinned fruit-dove, Ptilinopus leclancheri (A)

Cuckoos
Order: CuculiformesFamily: Cuculidae

The family Cuculidae includes cuckoos, roadrunners and anis. These birds are of variable size with slender bodies, long tails and strong legs. The Old World cuckoos are brood parasites.

Greater coucal, Centropus sinensis
Lesser coucal, Centropus bengalensis
Chestnut-winged cuckoo, Clamator coromandus (A)
Pied cuckoo, Clamator jacobinus (A)
Asian koel, Eudynamys scolopacea (A)
Horsfield's bronze-cuckoo, Chrysococcyx basalis (A)
Plaintive cuckoo, Cacomantis merulinus (A)
Square-tailed drongo-cuckoo, Surniculus lugubris
Large hawk-cuckoo, Hierococcyx sparverioides
Northern hawk-cuckoo, Hierococcyx hyperythrus (A)
Hodgson's hawk-cuckoo, Hierococcyx nisicolor (A)
Lesser cuckoo, Cuculus poliocephalus
Indian cuckoo, Cuculus micropterus
Himalayan cuckoo, Cuculus saturatus
Common cuckoo, Cuculus canorus (A)
Oriental cuckoo, Cuculus optatus

Nightjars and allies
Order: CaprimulgiformesFamily: Caprimulgidae

Nightjars are medium-sized nocturnal birds that usually nest on the ground. They have long wings, short legs and very short bills. Most have small feet, of little use for walking, and long pointed wings. Their soft plumage is camouflaged to resemble bark or leaves.

Gray nightjar, Caprimulgus jotaka
Savanna nightjar, Caprimulgus affinis

Swifts
Order: CaprimulgiformesFamily: Apodidae

Swifts are small birds which spend the majority of their lives flying. These birds have very short legs and never settle voluntarily on the ground, perching instead only on vertical surfaces. Many swifts have long swept-back wings which resemble a crescent or boomerang.

White-throated needletail, Hirundapus caudacutus
Silver-backed needletail, Hirundapus cochinchinensis
Purple needletail, Hirundapus celebensis (A)
Germain's swiftlet, Aerodramus germani (A)
Pacific swift, Apus pacificus
House swift, Apus nipalensis

Rails, gallinules, and coots
Order: GruiformesFamily: Rallidae

Rallidae is a large family of small to medium-sized birds which includes the rails, crakes, coots and gallinules. Typically they inhabit dense vegetation in damp environments near lakes, swamps or rivers. In general they are shy and secretive birds, making them difficult to observe. Most species have strong legs and long toes which are well adapted to soft uneven surfaces. They tend to have short, rounded wings and to be weak fliers.

Water rail, Rallus aquaticus (A)
Brown-cheeked rail, Rallus indicus
Slaty-breasted rail, Lewinia striata
Spotted crake, Porzana porzana (A)
Eurasian moorhen, Gallinula chloropus
Eurasian coot, Fulica atra
Australasian swamphen, Porphyrio melanotus (A)
Gray-headed swamphen, Porphyrio poliocephalus (A)
White-browed crake, Poliolimnas cinereus (A)
Watercock, Gallicrex cinerea
White-breasted waterhen, Amaurornis phoenicurus
Red-legged crake, Rallina fasciata (A)
Slaty-legged crake, Rallina eurizonoides
Ruddy-breasted crake, Zapornia fusca
Band-bellied crake, Zapornia paykullii (A)
Brown crake, Zapornia akool
Baillon's crake, Zapornia pusilla (A)

Cranes
Order: GruiformesFamily: Gruidae

Cranes are large, long-legged and long-necked birds. Unlike the similar-looking but unrelated herons, cranes fly with necks outstretched, not pulled back. Most have elaborate and noisy courting displays or "dances".

Demoiselle crane, Anthropoides virgo (A)
Siberian crane, Leucogeranus leucogeranus (A)
Sandhill crane, Antigone canadensis (A)
White-naped crane, Antigone vipio (A)
Common crane, Grus grus
Hooded crane, Grus monacha
Red-crowned crane, Grus japonensis (A)

Stilts and avocets
Order: CharadriiformesFamily: Recurvirostridae

Recurvirostridae is a family of large wading birds, which includes the avocets and stilts. The avocets have long legs and long up-curved bills. The stilts have extremely long legs and long, thin, straight bills. 

Black-winged stilt, Himantopus himantopus
Pied avocet, Recurvirostra avosetta (A)

Oystercatchers
Order: CharadriiformesFamily: Haematopodidae

The oystercatchers are large and noisy plover-like birds, with strong bills used for smashing or prising open molluscs. 

Eurasian oystercatcher, Haematopus ostralegus

Plovers and lapwings
Order: CharadriiformesFamily: Charadriidae

The family Charadriidae includes the plovers, dotterels and lapwings. They are small to medium-sized birds with compact bodies, short, thick necks and long, usually pointed, wings. They are found in open country worldwide, mostly in habitats near water.

Black-bellied plover, Pluvialis squatarola
Pacific golden-plover, Pluvialis fulva
Northern lapwing, Vanellus vanellus
Gray-headed lapwing, Vanellus cinereus (A)
Lesser sand-plover, Charadrius mongolus
Greater sand-plover, Charadrius leschenaultii
Kentish plover, Charadrius alexandrinus
White-faced plover, Charadrius dealbatus
Common ringed plover, Charadrius hiaticula
Long-billed plover, Charadrius placidus
Little ringed plover, Charadrius dubius
Oriental plover, Charadrius veredus

Painted-snipes
Order: CharadriiformesFamily: Rostratulidae

Painted-snipes are short-legged, long-billed birds similar in shape to the true snipes, but more brightly coloured. 

Greater painted-snipe, Rostratula benghalensis

Jacanas
Order: CharadriiformesFamily: Jacanidae

The jacanas are a group of tropical waders in the family Jacanidae. They are found throughout the tropics. They are identifiable by their huge feet and claws which enable them to walk on floating vegetation in the shallow lakes that are their preferred habitat.

Pheasant-tailed jacana, Hydrophasianus chirurgus

Sandpipers and allies
Order: CharadriiformesFamily: Scolopacidae

Scolopacidae is a large diverse family of small to medium-sized shorebirds including the sandpipers, curlews, godwits, shanks, tattlers, woodcocks, snipes, dowitchers and phalaropes. The majority of these species eat small invertebrates picked out of the mud or soil. Variation in length of legs and bills enables multiple species to feed in the same habitat, particularly on the coast, without direct competition for food.

Whimbrel, Numenius phaeopus
Little curlew, Numenius minutus
Far Eastern curlew, Numenius madagascariensis
Eurasian curlew, Numenius arquata
Bar-tailed godwit, Limosa lapponica
Black-tailed godwit, Limosa limosa
Ruddy turnstone, Arenaria interpres
Great knot, Calidris tenuirostris
Red knot, Calidris canutus
Ruff, Calidris pugnax
Broad-billed sandpiper, Calidris falcinellus
Sharp-tailed sandpiper, Calidris acuminata
Stilt sandpiper, Calidris himantopus (A)
Curlew sandpiper, Calidris ferruginea
Temminck's stint, Calidris temminckii
Long-toed stint, Calidris subminuta
Spoon-billed sandpiper, Calidris pygmeus
Red-necked stint, Calidris ruficollis
Sanderling, Calidris alba
Dunlin, Calidris alpina
Little stint, Calidris minuta
Buff-breasted sandpiper, Calidris subruficollis (A)
Pectoral sandpiper, Calidris melanotos (A)
Western sandpiper, Calidris mauri (A)
Asian dowitcher, Limnodromus semipalmatus
Long-billed dowitcher, Limnodromus scolopaceus
Jack snipe, Lymnocryptes minimus (A)
Eurasian woodcock, Scolopax rusticola
Solitary snipe, Gallinago solitaria (A)
Latham's snipe, Gallinago hardwickii (A)
Common snipe, Gallinago gallinago
Pin-tailed snipe, Gallinago stenura
Swinhoe's snipe, Gallinago megala
Terek sandpiper, Xenus cinereus
Red-necked phalarope, Phalaropus lobatus
Red phalarope, Phalaropus fulicarius (A)
Common sandpiper, Actitis hypoleucos
Green sandpiper, Tringa ochropus
Gray-tailed tattler, Tringa brevipes
Wandering tattler, Tringa incana (A)
Spotted redshank, Tringa erythropus
Common greenshank, Tringa nebularia
Nordmann's greenshank, Tringa guttifer (A)
Lesser yellowlegs, Tringa flavipes (A)
Marsh sandpiper, Tringa stagnatilis
Wood sandpiper, Tringa glareola
Common redshank, Tringa totanus

Buttonquail
Order: CharadriiformesFamily: Turnicidae

The buttonquail are small, drab, running birds which resemble the true quails. The female is the brighter of the sexes and initiates courtship. The male incubates the eggs and tends the young. 

Small buttonquail, Turnix sylvatica
Yellow-legged buttonquail, Turnix tanki (A)
Barred buttonquail, Turnix suscitator

Pratincoles and coursers
Order: CharadriiformesFamily: Glareolidae

Glareolidae is a family of wading birds comprising the pratincoles, which have short legs, long pointed wings and long forked tails, and the coursers, which have long legs, short wings and long, pointed bills which curve downwards.

Oriental pratincole, Glareola maldivarum

Skuas and jaegers
Order: CharadriiformesFamily: Stercorariidae

The family Stercorariidae are, in general, medium to large birds, typically with grey or brown plumage, often with white markings on the wings. They nest on the ground in temperate and arctic regions and are long-distance migrants.

South Polar skua, Stercorarius maccormicki (A)
Pomarine jaeger, Stercorarius pomarinus (A)
Parasitic jaeger, Stercorarius parasiticus (A)
Long-tailed jaeger, Stercorarius longicaudus (A)

Auks, murres, and puffins
Order: CharadriiformesFamily: Alcidae

Alcids are superficially similar to penguins due to their black-and-white colours, their upright posture and some of their habits, however they are not related to the penguins and differ in being able to fly. Auks live on the open sea, only deliberately coming ashore to nest. 

Common murre, Uria aalge (A)
Ancient murrelet, Synthliboramphus antiquus (A)
Japanese murrelet, Synthliboramphus wumizusume (A)

Gulls, terns, and skimmers
Order: CharadriiformesFamily: Laridae

Laridae is a family of medium to large seabirds, the gulls, terns, and skimmers. Gulls are typically grey or white, often with black markings on the head or wings. They have stout, longish bills and webbed feet. Terns are a group of generally medium to large seabirds typically with grey or white plumage, often with black markings on the head. Most terns hunt fish by diving but some pick insects off the surface of fresh water. Terns are generally long-lived birds, with several species known to live in excess of 30 years.

Black-legged kittiwake, Rissa tridactyla
Sabine's gull, Xema sabini (A)
Saunders's gull, Saundersilarus saundersi
Slender-billed gull, Chroicocephalus genei (A)
Silver gull, Chroicocephalus novaehollandiae (A)
Black-headed gull, Chroicocephalus ridibundus
Brown-headed gull, Chroicocephalus brunnicephalus (A)
Little gull, Hydrocoloeus minutus (A)
Ross's gull, Rhodostethia rosea (A)
Laughing gull, Leucophaeus atricilla (A)
Franklin's gull, Leucophaeus pipixcan (A)
Relict gull, Ichthyaetus relictus (A)
Pallas's gull, Ichthyaetus ichthyaetus (A)
Black-tailed gull, Larus crassirostris
Common gull, Larus canus
Herring gull, Larus argentatus
Caspian gull, Larus cachinnans (A)
Lesser black-backed gull, Larus fuscus (A)
Slaty-backed gull, Larus schistisagus (A)
Glaucous gull, Larus hyperboreus
Brown noddy, Anous stolidus
Black noddy, Anous minutus (A)
Sooty tern, Onychoprion fuscatus
Bridled tern, Onychoprion anaethetus
Aleutian tern, Onychoprion aleuticus
Little tern, Sternula albifrons
Gull-billed tern, Gelochelidon nilotica
Caspian tern, Hydroprogne caspia
Black tern, Chlidonias niger
White-winged tern, Chlidonias leucopterus
Whiskered tern, Chlidonias hybrida
Roseate tern, Sterna dougallii
Black-naped tern, Sterna sumatrana
Common tern, Sterna hirundo
Great crested tern, Thalasseus bergii
Sandwich tern, Thalasseus sandvicensis (A)
Lesser crested tern, Thalasseus bengalensis (A)
Chinese crested tern, Thalasseus bernsteini

Tropicbirds

Order: PhaethontiformesFamily: Phaethontidae

Tropicbirds are slender white birds of tropical oceans, with exceptionally long central tail feathers. Their heads and long wings have black markings.

White-tailed tropicbird, Phaethon lepturus (A)
Red-billed tropicbird, Phaethon aethereus (A)
Red-tailed tropicbird, Phaethon rubricauda (A)

Loons
Order: GaviiformesFamily: Gaviidae

Loons, known as divers in Europe, are a group of aquatic birds found in many parts of North America and northern Europe. They are the size of a large duck or small goose, which they somewhat resemble when swimming, but to which they are completely unrelated.

Red-throated loon, Gavia stellata (A)
Arctic loon, Gavia arctica
Pacific loon, Gavia pacifica (A)
Yellow-billed loon, Gavia adamsii (A)

Albatrosses
Order: ProcellariiformesFamily: Diomedeidae

The albatrosses are among the largest of flying birds, and the great albatrosses from the genus Diomedea have the largest wingspans of any extant birds. 

Laysan albatross, Phoebastria immutabilis (A)
Black-footed albatross, Phoebastria nigripes
Short-tailed albatross, Phoebastria albatrus

Southern storm-petrels
Order: ProcellariiformesFamily: Oceanitidae

The southern storm-petrels are relatives of the petrels and are the smallest seabirds. They feed on planktonic crustaceans and small fish picked from the surface, typically while hovering.

Wilson's storm-petrel, Oceanites oceanicus (A)

Northern storm-petrels
Order: ProcellariiformesFamily: Hydrobatidae

The northern storm-petrels are relatives of the petrels and are the smallest seabirds. They feed on planktonic crustaceans and small fish picked from the surface, typically while hovering. The flight is fluttering and sometimes bat-like.

Leach's storm-petrel, Hydrobates leucorhous (A)
Swinhoe's storm-petrel, Hydrobates monorhis
Tristram's storm-petrel, Hydrobates tristrami (A)

Shearwaters and petrels
Order: ProcellariiformesFamily: Procellariidae

The procellariids are the main group of medium-sized "true petrels", characterised by united nostrils with medium septum and a long outer functional primary. 

Northern fulmar, Fulmarus glacialis (A)
Kermadec petrel, Pterodroma neglecta (A)
Providence petrel, Pterodroma solandri (A)
Bonin petrel, Pterodroma hypoleuca
Bulwer's petrel, Bulweria bulwerii (A)
Tahiti petrel, 	Pseudobulweria rostrata (A)
Streaked shearwater, Calonectris leucomelas
Flesh-footed shearwater, Ardenna carneipes
Wedge-tailed shearwater, Ardenna pacificus
Sooty shearwater, Ardenna griseus
Short-tailed shearwater, Ardenna tenuirostris

Storks
Order: CiconiiformesFamily: Ciconiidae

Storks are large, long-legged, long-necked, wading birds with long, stout bills. Storks are mute, but bill-clattering is an important mode of communication at the nest. Their nests can be large and may be reused for many years. Many species are migratory.

Black stork, Ciconia nigra
White stork, Ciconia ciconia
Oriental stork, Ciconia boyciana

Frigatebirds
Order: SuliformesFamily: Fregatidae

Frigatebirds are large seabirds usually found over tropical oceans. They are large, black-and-white or completely black, with long wings and deeply forked tails. The males have coloured inflatable throat pouches. They do not swim or walk and cannot take off from a flat surface. Having the largest wingspan-to-body-weight ratio of any bird, they are essentially aerial, able to stay aloft for more than a week.

Lesser frigatebird, Fregata ariel (A)
Christmas Island frigatebird, Fregata andrewsi (A)
Great frigatebird, Fregata minor (A)

Boobies and gannets
Order: SuliformesFamily: Sulidae

The sulids comprise the gannets and boobies. Both groups are medium to large coastal seabirds that plunge-dive for fish.

Masked booby, Sula dactylatra (A)
Brown booby, Sula leucogaster
Red-footed booby, Sula sula (A)

Cormorants and shags
Order: SuliformesFamily: Phalacrocoracidae

Phalacrocoracidae is a family of medium to large coastal, fish-eating seabirds that includes cormorants and shags. Plumage colouration varies, with the majority having mainly dark plumage, some species being black-and-white and a few being colourful.

Pelagic cormorant, Urile pelagicus (A)
Great cormorant, Phalacrocorax carbo
Japanese cormorant, Phalacrocorax capillatus

Pelicans
Order: PelecaniformesFamily: Pelecanidae

Pelicans are large water birds with a distinctive pouch under their beak. As with other members of the order Pelecaniformes, they have webbed feet with four toes.

Dalmatian pelican, Pelecanus crispus (A)

Herons, egrets, and bitterns
Order: PelecaniformesFamily: Ardeidae

The family Ardeidae contains the bitterns, herons and egrets. Herons and egrets are medium to large wading birds with long necks and legs. Bitterns tend to be shorter necked and more wary. Members of Ardeidae fly with their necks retracted, unlike other long-necked birds such as storks, ibises and spoonbills.

Great bittern, Botaurus stellaris
Yellow bittern, Ixobrychus sinensis
Schrenck's bittern, Ixobrychus eurhythmus (A)
Cinnamon bittern, Ixobrychus cinnamomeus
Black bittern, Ixobrychus flavicollis
Gray heron, Ardea cinerea
Purple heron, Ardea purpurea
Great egret, Ardea alba
Intermediate egret, Ardea intermedia
White-faced heron, Egretta novaehollandiae
Chinese egret, Egretta eulophotes
Little egret, Egretta garzetta
Pacific reef-heron, Egretta sacra
Pied heron, Egretta picata (A)
Cattle egret, Bubulcus ibis
Indian pond-heron, Ardeola grayii (A)
Chinese pond-heron, Ardeola bacchus (A)
Javan pond-heron, Ardeola speciosa (A)
Striated heron, Butorides striata
Black-crowned night-heron, Nycticorax nycticorax
Nankeen night-heron, Nycticorax caledonicus (A)
Japanese night-heron, Gorsachius goisagi
Malayan night-heron, Gorsachius melanolophus

Ibises and spoonbills
Order: PelecaniformesFamily: Threskiornithidae

Threskiornithidae is a family of large terrestrial and wading birds which includes the ibises and spoonbills. They have long, broad wings with 11 primary and about 20 secondary feathers. They are strong fliers and despite their size and weight, very capable soarers.

Glossy ibis, Plegadis falcinellus (A)
African sacred ibis, Threskiornis aethiopicus (I)
Black-headed ibis, Threskiornis melanocephalus
Crested ibis, Nipponia nippon (A)
Eurasian spoonbill, Platalea leucorodia (A)
Black-faced spoonbill, Platalea minor

Osprey
Order: AccipitriformesFamily: Pandionidae

The family Pandionidae contains only one species, the osprey. The osprey is a medium-large raptor which is a specialist fish-eater with a worldwide distribution.

Osprey, Pandion haliaetus

Hawks, eagles, and kites
Order: AccipitriformesFamily: Accipitridae

Accipitridae is a family of birds of prey, which includes hawks, eagles, kites, harriers and Old World vultures. These birds have powerful hooked beaks for tearing flesh from their prey, strong legs, powerful talons and keen eyesight.

Black-winged kite, Elanus caeruleus
Oriental honey-buzzard, Pernis ptilorhynchus
Black baza, Aviceda leuphotes (A)
Cinereous vulture, Aegypius monachus (A)
Crested serpent-eagle, Spilornis cheela
Mountain hawk-eagle, Nisaetus nipalensis
Black eagle, Ictinaetus malaiensis
Greater spotted eagle, Clanga clanga
Booted eagle, Hieraaetus pennatus (A)
Imperial eagle, Aquila heliaca (A)
Golden eagle, Aquila chrysaetos (A)
Bonelli's eagle, Aquila fasciata (A)
Gray-faced buzzard, Butastur indicus
Eurasian marsh-harrier, Circus aeruginosus (A)
Eastern marsh-harrier, Circus spilonotus
Hen harrier, Circus cyaneus
Pied harrier, Circus melanoleucos (A)
Crested goshawk, Accipiter trivirgatus
Chinese sparrowhawk, Accipiter soloensis
Japanese sparrowhawk, Accipiter gularis
Besra, Accipiter virgatus
Eurasian sparrowhawk, Accipiter nisus
Northern goshawk, Accipiter gentilis
Black kite, Milvus migrans
Brahminy kite, Haliastur indus (A)
White-tailed eagle, Haliaeetus albicilla
White-bellied sea-eagle, Haliaeetus leucogaster
Rough-legged hawk, Buteo lagopus
Eastern buzzard, Buteo japonicus
Upland buzzard, Buteo hemilasius (A)

Barn-owls
Order: StrigiformesFamily: Tytonidae

Barn-owls are medium to large owls with large heads and characteristic heart-shaped faces. They have long strong legs with powerful talons.

Australasian grass-owl, Tyto longimembris

Owls
Order: StrigiformesFamily: Strigidae

The typical owls are small to large solitary nocturnal birds of prey. They have large forward-facing eyes and ears, a hawk-like beak and a conspicuous circle of feathers around each eye called a facial disk.

Mountain scops-owl, Otus spilocephalus
Collared scops-owl, Otus lettia
Ryukyu scops-owl, Otus elegans
Oriental scops-owl, Otus sunia
Tawny fish-owl, Ketupa flavipes
Collared owlet, Taenioptynx brodiei
Little owl, Athene noctua (A)
Brown wood-owl, Strix leptogrammica
Himalayan owl, Strix nivicolum
Long-eared owl, Asio otus
Short-eared owl, Asio flammeus
Northern boobook, Ninox japonica

Hoopoes
Order: BucerotiformesFamily: Upupidae

Hoopoes have black, white and orangey-pink colouring with a large erectile crest on their head.

Eurasian hoopoe, Upupa epops

Kingfishers
Order: CoraciiformesFamily: Alcedinidae

Kingfishers are medium-sized birds with large heads, long, pointed bills, short legs and stubby tails.

Common kingfisher, Alcedo atthis
Black-backed dwarf-kingfisher, Ceyx erithaca (A)
Rufous-backed dwarf-kingfisher, Ceyx rufidorsa (A)
Ruddy kingfisher, Halcyon coromanda
White-throated kingfisher, Halcyon smyrnensis 
Black-capped kingfisher, Halcyon pileata (A)
Collared kingfisher, Todiramphus chloris (A)
Pied kingfisher, Ceryle rudis

Bee-eaters
Order: CoraciiformesFamily: Meropidae

The bee-eaters are a group of near passerine birds in the family Meropidae. Most species are found in Africa but others occur in southern Europe, Madagascar, Australia and New Guinea. They are characterized by richly colored plumage, slender bodies and usually elongated central tail feathers. All are colorful and have long downturned bills and pointed wings, which give them a swallow-like appearance when seen from afar.

Blue-cheeked bee-eater, Merops persicus (A)
Blue-tailed bee-eater, Merops philippinus
Rainbow bee-eater, Merops ornatus (A)

Rollers
Order: CoraciiformesFamily: Coraciidae

Rollers resemble crows in size and build, but are more closely related to the kingfishers and bee-eaters. They share the colourful appearance of those groups with blues and browns predominating. The two inner front toes are connected, but the outer toe is not. 

Dollarbird, Eurystomus orientalis

Asian barbets
Order: PiciformesFamily: Megalaimidae

The Asian barbets are plump birds, with short necks and large heads. They get their name from the bristles which fringe their heavy bills. Most species are brightly coloured.

Taiwan barbet, Psilopogon nuchalis (E)

Woodpeckers
Order: PiciformesFamily: Picidae

Woodpeckers are small to medium-sized birds with chisel-like beaks, short legs, stiff tails and long tongues used for capturing insects. Some species have feet with two toes pointing forward and two backward, while several species have only three toes. Many woodpeckers have the habit of tapping noisily on tree trunks with their beaks.

Eurasian wryneck, Jynx torquilla (A)
Gray-capped pygmy woodpecker, Yungipicus canicapillus
White-backed woodpecker, Dendrocopos leucotos
Gray-headed woodpecker, Picus canus

Falcons and caracaras
Order: FalconiformesFamily: Falconidae

Falconidae is a family of diurnal birds of prey. They differ from hawks, eagles and kites in that they kill with their beaks instead of their talons.

Eurasian kestrel, Falco tinnunculus
Amur falcon, Falco amurensis (A)
Merlin, Falco columbarius
Eurasian hobby, Falco subbuteo
Peregrine falcon, Falco peregrinus

Pittas
Order: PasseriformesFamily: Pittidae

Pittas are medium-sized by passerine standards and are stocky, with fairly long, strong legs, short tails and stout bills. Many are brightly coloured. They spend the majority of their time on wet forest floors, eating snails, insects and similar invertebrates. 

Blue-winged pitta, Pitta moluccensis (A)
Fairy pitta, Pitta nympha
Hooded pitta, Pitta sordida (A)

Cuckooshrikes
Order: PasseriformesFamily: Campephagidae

The cuckooshrikes are small to medium-sized passerine birds. They are predominantly greyish with white and black, although some species are brightly coloured.

Gray-chinned minivet, Pericrocotus solaris
Long-tailed minivet, Pericrocotus ethologus (A)
Scarlet minivet, Pericrocotus speciosus (A)
Ryukyu minivet, Pericrocotus tegimae (A)
Ashy minivet, Pericrocotus divaricatus
Brown-rumped minivet, Pericrocotus cantonensis (A)
Rosy minivet, Pericrocotus roseus (A)
Large cuckooshrike, Coracina macei
Pied triller, Lalage nigra (A)
Black-winged cuckooshrike, Lalage melaschistos

Vireos, shrike-babblers, and erpornis
Order: PasseriformesFamily: Vireonidae

Most of the members of this family are found in the New World. However, the shrike-babblers and erpornis, which only slightly resemble the "true" vireos and greenlets, are found in South East Asia.

White-bellied erpornis, Erpornis zantholeuca

Old World orioles
Order: PasseriformesFamily: Oriolidae

The Old World orioles are colourful passerine birds. They are not related to the New World orioles.

Black-naped oriole, Oriolus chinensis
Maroon oriole, Oriolus traillii

Vangas, helmetshrikes, and allies
Order: PasseriformesFamily: Vangidae

The family Vangidae is highly variable, though most members of it resemble true shrikes to some degree.

Large woodshrike, Tephrodornis virgatus

Fantails
Order: PasseriformesFamily: Rhipiduridae

The fantails are small insectivorous birds which are specialist aerial feeders.

Philippine pied-fantail, Rhipidura nigritorquis (A)

Drongos
Order: PasseriformesFamily: Dicruridae

The drongos are mostly black or dark grey in colour, sometimes with metallic tints. They have long forked tails, and some Asian species have elaborate tail decorations. They have short legs and sit very upright when perched, like a shrike. They flycatch or take prey from the ground.

Black drongo, Dicrurus macrocercus
Ashy drongo, Dicrurus leucophaeus
Crow-billed drongo, Dicrurus annectens
Bronzed drongo, Dicrurus aeneus
Hair-crested drongo, Dicrurus hottentottus

Monarch flycatchers
Order: PasseriformesFamily: Monarchidae

The monarch flycatchers are small to medium-sized insectivorous passerines which hunt by flycatching.

Black-naped monarch, Hypothymis azurea
Japanese paradise-flycatcher, Terpsiphone atrocaudata
Amur paradise-flycatcher, Terpsiphone incei (A)

Shrikes
Order: PasseriformesFamily: Laniidae

Shrikes are passerine birds known for their habit of catching other birds and small animals and impaling the uneaten portions of their bodies on thorns. A typical shrike's beak is hooked, like a bird of prey.

Tiger shrike, Lanius tigrinus (A)
Bull-headed shrike, Lanius bucephalus
Red-backed shrike, Lanius collurio (A)
Isabelline shrike, Lanius isabellinus (A)
Brown shrike, Lanius cristatus
Burmese shrike, Lanius collurioides (A)
Long-tailed shrike, Lanius schach
Gray-backed shrike, Lanius tephronotus (A)
Great gray shrike, Lanius excubitor (A)
Chinese gray shrike, Lanius sphenocercus (A)

Crows, jays, and magpies
Order: PasseriformesFamily: Corvidae

The family Corvidae includes crows, ravens, jays, choughs, magpies, treepies, nutcrackers and ground jays. Corvids are above average in size among the Passeriformes, and some of the larger species show high levels of intelligence.

Eurasian jay, Garrulus glandarius
Azure-winged magpie, Cyanopica cyanus (I)
Taiwan blue-magpie, Urocissa caerulea (E)
Gray treepie, Dendrocitta formosae
Oriental magpie, Pica serica
Eurasian nutcracker, Nucifraga caryocatactes
Daurian jackdaw, Corvus dauuricus (A)
House crow, Corvus splendens (A)
Rook, Corvus frugilegus
Carrion crow, Corvus corone (A)
Large-billed crow, Corvus macrorhynchos
Collared crow, Corvus torquatus (A)

Fairy flycatchers
Order: PasseriformesFamily: Stenostiridae

Most of the species of this small family are found in Africa, though a few inhabit tropical Asia. They are not closely related to other birds called "flycatchers".

Gray-headed canary-flycatcher, Culicicapa ceylonensis (A)

Tits, chickadees, and titmice
Order: PasseriformesFamily: Paridae

The Paridae are mainly small stocky woodland species with short stout bills. Some have crests. They are adaptable birds, with a mixed diet including seeds and insects.

Coal tit, Periparus ater
Yellow-bellied tit, Periparus venustulus (A)
Chestnut-bellied tit, Sittiparus castaneoventris (E)
Varied tit, Sittiparus varius (A)
Green-backed tit, Parus monticolus
Japanese tit, Parus minor
Taiwan yellow tit, Machlolophus holsti (E)

Penduline-tits
Order: PasseriformesFamily: Remizidae

The penduline-tits are a group of small passerine birds related to the true tits. They are insectivores.

Chinese penduline-tit, Remiz consobrinus

Larks
Order: PasseriformesFamily: Alaudidae

Larks are small terrestrial birds with often extravagant songs and display flights. Most larks are fairly dull in appearance. Their food is insects and seeds. 

Mongolian short-toed lark, Calandrella dukhunensis (A)
Asian short-toed lark, Alaudala cheleensis (A)
Eurasian skylark, Alauda arvensis (A)
Oriental skylark, Alauda gulgula

Cisticolas and allies
Order: PasseriformesFamily: Cisticolidae

The Cisticolidae are warblers found mainly in warmer southern regions of the Old World. They are generally very small birds of drab brown or grey appearance found in open country such as grassland or scrub. 

Himalayan prinia, Prinia crinigera
Striped prinia, Prinia striata
Yellow-bellied prinia, Prinia flaviventris
Plain prinia, Prinia inornata
Zitting cisticola, Cisticola juncidis
Golden-headed cisticola, Cisticola exilis

Reed warblers and allies
Order: PasseriformesFamily: Acrocephalidae

The members of this family are usually rather large for "warblers". Most are rather plain olivaceous brown above with much yellow to beige below. They are usually found in open woodland, reedbeds, or tall grass. The family occurs mostly in southern to western Eurasia and surroundings, but it also ranges far into the Pacific, with some species in Africa.

Thick-billed warbler, Arundinax aedon (A)
Booted warbler, Iduna caligata (A)
Black-browed reed warbler, Acrocephalus bistrigiceps
Streaked reed warbler, Acrocephalus sorghophilus (A)
Paddyfield warbler, Acrocephalus agricola (A)
Manchurian reed warbler, Acrocephalus tangorum (A)
Blyth's reed warbler, Acrocephalus dumetorum (A)
Oriental reed warbler, Acrocephalus orientalis

Grassbirds and allies
Order: PasseriformesFamily: Locustellidae

Locustellidae are a family of small insectivorous songbirds found mainly in Eurasia, Africa, and the Australian region. They are smallish birds with tails that are usually long and pointed, and tend to be drab brownish or buffy all over.

Gray's grasshopper warbler, Helopsaltes fasciolatus (A)
Sakhalin grasshopper warbler, Helopsaltes amnicola 
Pallas's grasshopper warbler, Helopsaltes certhiola
Middendorff's grasshopper warbler, Helopsaltes ochotensis (A)
Pleske's grasshopper warbler, Helopsaltes pleskei (A)
Lanceolated warbler, Locustella lanceolata
Taiwan bush warbler, Locustella alishanensis (E)
Russet bush warbler, Locustella mandelli (A)

Cupwings
Order: PasseriformesFamily: Pnoepygidae

The members of this small family are found in mountainous parts of South and South East Asia.

Taiwan cupwing, Pnoepyga formosana (E)

Swallows
Order: PasseriformesFamily: Hirundinidae

The family Hirundinidae is adapted to aerial feeding. They have a slender streamlined body, long pointed wings and a short bill with a wide gape. The feet are adapted to perching rather than walking, and the front toes are partially joined at the base.

Gray-throated martin, Riparia chinensis
Bank swallow, Riparia riparia
Pale sand martin, Riparia diluta (A)
Barn swallow, Hirundo rustica
Pacific swallow, Hirundo tahitica
Red-rumped swallow, Cecropis daurica
Striated swallow, Cecropis striolata
Common house-martin, Delichon urbicum (A)
Asian house-martin, Delichon dasypus

Bulbuls
Order: PasseriformesFamily: Pycnonotidae

Bulbuls are medium-sized songbirds. Some are colourful with yellow, red or orange vents, cheeks, throats or supercilia, but most are drab, with uniform olive-brown to black plumage. Some species have distinct crests. 

Collared finchbill, Spizixos semitorques
Styan's bulbul, Pycnonotus taivanus (E)
Light-vented bulbul, Pycnonotus sinensis
Sooty-headed bulbul, Pycnonotus aurigaster (A)
Black bulbul, Hypsipetes leucocephalus
Brown-eared bulbul, Hypsipetes amaurotis
Chestnut bulbul, Hemixos castanonotus (A)

Leaf warblers
Order: PasseriformesFamily: Phylloscopidae

Leaf warblers are a family of small insectivorous birds found mostly in Eurasia and ranging into Wallacea and Africa. The species are of various sizes, often green-plumaged above and yellow below, or more subdued with greyish-green to greyish-brown colours.

Wood warbler, Phylloscopus sibilatrix (A)
Yellow-browed warbler, Phylloscopus inornatus
Hume's warbler, Phylloscopus humei (A)
Chinese leaf warbler, Phylloscopus yunnanensis (A)  
Pallas's leaf warbler, Phylloscopus proregulus
Radde's warbler, Phylloscopus schwarzi (A)
Yellow-streaked warbler, Phylloscopus armandii (A)
Tickell's leaf warbler, Phylloscopus affinis (A)
Dusky warbler, Phylloscopus fuscatus
Buff-throated warbler, Phylloscopus subaffinis (A)
Willow warbler, Phylloscopus trochilus (A)
Mountain chiffchaff, Phylloscopus sindianus (A)
Common chiffchaff, Phylloscopus collybita (A)
Eastern crowned warbler, Phylloscopus coronatus (A)
Ijima's leaf warbler, Phylloscopus ijimae (A)
White-spectacled warbler, Phylloscopus intermedius (A)
Bianchi's warbler, Phylloscopus valentini (A)
Alström's warbler, Phylloscopus soror (A)
Greenish warbler, Phylloscopus trochiloides (A)
Two-barred warbler, Phylloscopus plumbeitarsus (A)
Pale-legged leaf warbler, Phylloscopus tenellipes
Sakhalin leaf warbler, Phylloscopus borealoides (A)
Japanese leaf warbler, Phylloscopus xanthodryas
Arctic warbler, Phylloscopus borealis
Kamchatka leaf warbler, Phylloscopus examinandus (A)
Chestnut-crowned warbler, Phylloscopus castaniceps (A)
Sulphur-breasted warbler, Phylloscopus ricketti (A)
Blyth's leaf warbler, Phylloscopus reguloides (A)
Claudia's leaf warbler, Phylloscopus claudiae (A)
Hartert's leaf warbler, Phylloscopus goodsoni (A)
Kloss's leaf warbler, Phylloscopus ogilviegranti

Bush warblers and allies
Order: PasseriformesFamily: Scotocercidae

The members of this family are found throughout Africa, Asia, and Polynesia. Their taxonomy is in flux, and some authorities place some genera in other families.

Asian stubtail, Urosphena squameiceps
Rufous-faced warbler, Abroscopus albogularis
Japanese bush warbler, Horornis diphone
Manchurian bush warbler, Horornis borealis
Brownish-flanked bush warbler, Horornis fortipes
Yellowish-bellied bush warbler, Horornis acanthizoides

Long-tailed tits
Order: PasseriformesFamily: Aegithalidae

Long-tailed tits are a group of small passerine birds with medium to long tails. They make woven bag nests in trees. Most eat a mixed diet which includes insects. 

Black-throated tit, Aegithalos concinnus

Sylviid warblers, parrotbills, and allies
Order: PasseriformesFamily: Sylviidae

The family Sylviidae is a group of small insectivorous passerine birds. They mainly occur as breeding species, as the common name implies, in Europe, Asia and, to a lesser extent, Africa. Most are of generally undistinguished appearance, but many have distinctive songs.

Lesser whitethroat, Curruca curruca (A)
Asian desert warbler, Curruca nana (A)
Taiwan fulvetta, Fulvetta formosana (E)
Golden parrotbill, Suthora verreauxi
Vinous-throated parrotbill, Sinosuthura webbiana

White-eyes, yuhinas, and allies
Order: PasseriformesFamily: Zosteropidae

The white-eyes are small and mostly undistinguished, their plumage above being generally some dull colour like greenish-olive, but some species have a white or bright yellow throat, breast or lower parts, and several have buff flanks. As their name suggests, many species have a white ring around each eye.

Indochinese yuhina, Staphida torqueola (A)
Taiwan yuhina, Yuhina brunneiceps (E)
Chestnut-flanked white-eye, Zosterops erythropleurus (A
Swinhoe's white-eye, Zosterops simplex
Warbling white-eye, Zosterops japonicus
Lowland white-eye, Zosterops meyeni

Tree-babblers, scimitar-babblers, and allies
Order: PasseriformesFamily: Timaliidae

The babblers, or timaliids, are somewhat diverse in size and colouration, but are characterised by soft fluffy plumage.

Rufous-capped babbler, Cyanoderma ruficeps
Taiwan scimitar-babbler, Pomatorhinus musicus (E)
Black-necklaced scimitar-babbler, Erythrogenys erythrocnemis (E)

Ground babblers and allies
Order: PasseriformesFamily: Pellorneidae

These small to medium-sized songbirds have soft fluffy plumage but are otherwise rather diverse. Members of the genus Illadopsis are found in forests, but some other genera are birds of scrublands.

Dusky fulvetta, Schoeniparus brunneus

Laughingthrushes and allies
Order: PasseriformesFamily: Leiothrichidae

The members of this family are diverse in size and colouration, though those of genus Turdoides tend to be brown or greyish. The family is found in Africa, India, and southeast Asia.

Morrison's fulvetta, Alcippe morrisonia (E)
White-whiskered laughingthrush, Trochalopteron morrisonianum (E)
White-eared sibia, Heterophasia auricularis (E)
Taiwan barwing, Actinodura morrisoniana (E)
Steere's liocichla, Liocichla steerii (E)
Chinese hwamei, Garrulax canorus (I)
Taiwan hwamei, Garrulax taewanus (E)
Black-throated laughingthrush, Pterorhinus chinensis (I)
Masked laughingthrush, Garrulax perspicillatus (A)
Rufous-crowned laughingthrush, Pterorhinus ruficeps (E)
Rusty laughingthrush, Pterorhinus poecilorhynchus (E)

Kinglets
Order: PasseriformesFamily: Regulidae

The kinglets, also called crests, are a small group of birds often included in the Old World warblers, but frequently given family status because they also resemble the titmice. 

Goldcrest, Regulus regulus 
Flamecrest, Regulus goodfellowi (E)

Nuthatches
Order: PasseriformesFamily: Sittidae

Nuthatches are small woodland birds. They have the unusual ability to climb down trees head first, unlike other birds which can only go upwards. Nuthatches have big heads, short tails and powerful bills and feet. 

Eurasian nuthatch, Sitta europaea

Wrens
Order: PasseriformesFamily: Troglodytidae

The wrens are mainly small and inconspicuous except for their loud songs. These birds have short wings and thin down-turned bills. Several species often hold their tails upright. All are insectivorous.

Eurasian wren, Troglodytes troglodytes

Dippers
Order: PasseriformesFamily: Cinclidae

Dippers are a group of perching birds whose habitat includes aquatic environments in the Americas, Europe and Asia. They are named for their bobbing or dipping movements. 

Brown dipper, Cinclus pallasii

Starlings
Order: PasseriformesFamily: Sturnidae

Starlings are small to medium-sized passerine birds. Their flight is strong and direct and they are very gregarious. Their preferred habitat is fairly open country. They eat insects and fruit. Plumage is typically dark with a metallic sheen.

Asian glossy starling, Aplonis panayensis (I)
European starling, Sturnus vulgaris
Rosy starling, Pastor roseus (A)
Daurian starling, Agropsar sturninus
Chestnut-cheeked starling, Agropsar philippensis
Black-collared starling, Gracupica nigricolis 
White-shouldered starling, Sturnia sinensis
Chestnut-tailed starling, Sturnia malabarica (I)
Red-billed starling, Spodiopsar sericeus
White-cheeked starling, Spodiopsar cineraceus
Common myna, Acridotheres tristis (I)
Jungle myna, Acridotheres fuscus (I)
Javan myna, Acridotheres javanicus (I)
Crested myna, Acridotheres cristatellus

Thrushes and allies
Order: PasseriformesFamily: Turdidae

The thrushes are a group of passerine birds that occur mainly in the Old World. They are plump, soft plumaged, small to medium-sized insectivores or sometimes omnivores, often feeding on the ground. Many have attractive songs.

White's thrush, Zoothera aurea
Scaly thrush, Zoothera dauma
Siberian thrush, Geokichla sibirica
Orange-headed thrush, Geokichla citrina (A)
Chinese thrush, Otocichla mupinensis (A)
Chinese blackbird, Turdus mandarinus
Taiwan thrush, Turdus niveiceps (E)
Japanese thrush, Turdus cardis
Gray-backed thrush, Turdus hortulorum
Eyebrowed thrush, Turdus obscurus
Brown-headed thrush, Turdus chrysolaus
Pale thrush, Turdus pallidus
Island thrush, Turdus poliocephalus
Red-throated thrush, Turdus ruficollis (A)
Dusky thrush, Turdus eunomus
Naumann's thrush, Turdus naumanni

Old World flycatchers
Order: PasseriformesFamily: Muscicapidae

Old World flycatchers are a large group of small passerine birds native to the Old World. They are mainly small arboreal insectivores. The appearance of these birds is highly varied, but they mostly have weak songs and harsh calls.

Gray-streaked flycatcher, Muscicapa griseisticta
Dark-sided flycatcher, Muscicapa sibirica
Ferruginous flycatcher, Muscicapa ferruginea
Asian brown flycatcher, Muscicapa dauurica
Brown-breasted flycatcher, Muscicapa muttui (A)
Spotted flycatcher, Muscicapa striata (A)
Oriental magpie-robin, Copsychus saularis 
White-rumped shama, Copsychus malabaricus (I)
Hainan blue flycatcher, Cyornis hainanus (A)
Chinese blue flycatcher, Cyornis glaucicomans (A)
Hill blue flycatcher, Cyornis whitei (A)
Brown-chested jungle-flycatcher, Cyornis brunneatus (A)
Fujian niltava, Niltava davidi (A)
Rufous-bellied niltava, Niltava sundara (A)
Taiwan vivid niltava, Niltava vivida (E)
Blue-and-white flycatcher, Cyanoptila cyanomelana
Zappey's flycatcher, Cyanoptila cumatilis
Verditer flycatcher, Eumyias thalassinus (A)
Lesser shortwing, Brachypteryx leucophris (A)
Himalayan shortwing, Brachypteryx cruralis
Taiwan shortwing, Brachypteryx goodfellowi (E)
Rufous-tailed robin, Larvivora sibilans (A)
Japanese robin, Larvivora akahige (A)
Ryukyu robin, Larvivora komadori (A)
Siberian blue robin, Larvivora cyane
Bluethroat, Luscinia svecica (A)
Taiwan whistling-thrush, Myophonus insularis (E)
Blue whistling-thrush, Myophonus caeruleus
Little forktail, Enicurus scouleri
Siberian rubythroat, Calliope calliope
White-tailed robin, Myiomela leucura
Red-flanked bluetail, Tarsiger cyanurus
White-browed bush-robin, Tarsiger indicus
Collared bush-robin, Tarsiger johnstoniae (E)
Yellow-rumped flycatcher, Ficedula zanthopygia
Narcissus flycatcher, Ficedula narcissina (A)
Ryukyu flycatcher, Ficedula owstoni
Mugimaki flycatcher, Ficedula mugimaki (A)
Slaty-backed flycatcher, Ficedula erithacus (A)
Snowy-browed flycatcher, Ficedula hyperythra
Taiga flycatcher, Ficedula albicilla
Red-breasted flycatcher, Ficedula parva (A)
Blue-fronted redstart, Phoenicurus frontalis (A)
Plumbeous redstart, Phoenicurus fuliginosus
White-capped redstart, Phoenicurus leucocephalus (A)
Black redstart, Phoenicurus ochruros
Daurian redstart, Phoenicurus auroreus
White-throated rock-thrush, Monticola gularis (A)
Blue rock-thrush, Monticola solitarius
Siberian stonechat, Saxicola maurus
Amur stonechat, Saxicola stejnegeri
Pied bushchat, Saxicola caprata (A)
Gray bushchat, Saxicola ferreus (A)
Northern wheatear, Oenanthe oenanthe (A)
Isabelline wheatear, Oenanthe isabellina (A)
Desert wheatear, Oenanthe deserti (A)
Pied wheatear, Oenanthe pleschanka (A)

Waxwings
Order: PasseriformesFamily: Bombycillidae

The waxwings are a group of birds with soft silky plumage and unique red tips to some of the wing feathers. In the Bohemian and cedar waxwings, these tips look like sealing wax and give the group its name. These are arboreal birds of northern forests. They live on insects in summer and berries in winter. 

Bohemian waxwing, Bombycilla garrulus
Japanese waxwing, Bombycilla japonica (A)

Flowerpeckers
Order: PasseriformesFamily: Dicaeidae

The flowerpeckers are very small, stout, often brightly coloured birds, with short tails, short thick curved bills and tubular tongues.

Plain flowerpecker, Dicaeum minullum
Fire-breasted flowerpecker, Dicaeum ignipectus

Sunbirds and spiderhunters
Order: PasseriformesFamily: Nectariniidae

The sunbirds and spiderhunters are very small passerine birds which feed largely on nectar, although they will also take insects, especially when feeding young. Flight is fast and direct on their short wings. Most species can take nectar by hovering like a hummingbird, but usually perch to feed.

Olive-backed sunbird, Cinnyris jugularis (A)
Mrs. Gould's sunbird, Aethopyga gouldiae (A)
Fork-tailed sunbird, Aethopyga christinae

Leafbirds
Order: PasseriformesFamily: Chloropseidae

The leafbirds are small, bulbul-like birds. The males are brightly plumaged, usually in greens and yellows.

Orange-bellied leafbird, Chloropsis hardwickii (A)

Waxbills and allies
Order: PasseriformesFamily: Estrildidae

The estrildid finches are small passerine birds of the Old World tropics and Australasia. They are gregarious and often colonial seed eaters with short thick but pointed bills. They are all similar in structure and habits, but have wide variation in plumage colours and patterns.

Indian silverbill, Euodice malabarica (I)
Scaly-breasted munia, Lonchura punctulata 
White-rumped munia, Lonchura striata
Chestnut munia, Lonchura atricapilla (I)
Orange-cheeked waxbill, Estrilda melpoda (I)

Accentors
Order: PasseriformesFamily: Prunellidae

The accentors are in the only bird family, Prunellidae, which is completely endemic to the Palearctic. They are small, fairly drab species superficially similar to sparrows.

Alpine accentor, Prunella collaris
Siberian accentor, Prunella montanella (A)

Old World sparrows
Order: PasseriformesFamily: Passeridae

Old World sparrows are small passerine birds. In general, sparrows tend to be small, plump, brown or grey birds with short tails and short powerful beaks. Sparrows are seed eaters, but they also consume small insects. 

House sparrow, Passer domesticus (A)
Russet sparrow, Passer cinnamomeus
Eurasian tree sparrow, Passer montanus

Wagtails and pipits
Order: PasseriformesFamily: Motacillidae

Motacillidae is a family of small passerine birds with medium to long tails. They include the wagtails, longclaws and pipits. They are slender, ground feeding insectivores of open country. 

Forest wagtail, Dendronanthus indicus (A)
Gray wagtail, Motacilla cinerea
Western yellow wagtail, Motacilla flava
Eastern yellow wagtail, Motacilla tschutschensis
Citrine wagtail, Motacilla citreola
Japanese wagtail, Motacilla grandis (A)
White wagtail, Motacilla alba
Richard's pipit, Anthus richardi
Paddyfield pipit, Anthus rufulus (A)
Blyth's pipit, Anthus godlewskii (A)
Meadow pipit, Anthus pratensis (A)
Rosy pipit, Anthus roseatus (A)
Tree pipit, Anthus trivialis (A)
Olive-backed pipit, Anthus hodgsoni
Pechora pipit, Anthus gustavi
Red-throated pipit, Anthus cervinus
Water pipit, Anthus spinoletta (A)
American pipit, Anthus rubescens

Finches, euphonias, and allies
Order: PasseriformesFamily: Fringillidae

Finches are seed-eating passerine birds, that are small to moderately large and have a strong beak, usually conical and in some species very large. All have twelve tail feathers and nine primaries. These birds have a bouncing flight with alternating bouts of flapping and gliding on closed wings, and most sing well. 

Brambling, Fringilla montifringilla
Hawfinch, Coccothraustes coccothraustes
Yellow-billed grosbeak, Eophona migratoria
Japanese grosbeak, Eophona personata (A)
Common rosefinch, Carpodacus erythrinus
Taiwan rosefinch, Carpodacus formosanus (E)
Pallas's rosefinch, Carpodacus roseus (A)
Brown bullfinch, Pyrrhula nipalensis
Taiwan bullfinch, Pyrrhula owstoni (E)
Eurasian bullfinch, Pyrrhula pyrrhula (A)
Oriental greenfinch, Chloris sinica
Eurasian linnet, Linaria cannabina (A)
Common redpoll, Acanthis flammea
Red crossbill, Loxia curvirostra (A)
Eurasian siskin, Spinus spinus

Longspurs and snow buntings
Order: PasseriformesFamily: Calcariidae

The Calcariidae are a group of passerine birds which had been traditionally grouped with the New World sparrows, but differ in a number of respects and are usually found in open grassy areas.

Lapland longspur, Calcarius lapponicus (A)
Snow bunting, Plectrophenax nivalis (A)

Old World buntings
Order: PasseriformesFamily: Emberizidae

The emberizids are a large family of passerine birds. They are seed-eating birds with distinctively shaped bills. Many emberizid species have distinctive head patterns. 

Crested bunting, Emberiza lathami (A)
Black-headed bunting, Emberiza melanocephala (A)
Red-headed bunting, Emberiza bruniceps
Chestnut-eared bunting, Emberiza fucata
Meadow bunting, Emberiza cioides
Pine bunting, Emberiza leucocephalos (A)
Ortolan bunting, Emberiza hortulana (A)
Yellow-throated bunting, Emberiza elegans
Ochre-rumped bunting, Emberiza yessoensis (A)
Pallas's bunting, Emberiza pallasi (A)
Reed bunting, Emberiza schoeniclus (A)
Yellow-breasted bunting, Emberiza aureola
Little bunting, Emberiza pusilla
Rustic bunting, Emberiza rustica
Yellow bunting, Emberiza sulphurata
Black-faced bunting, Emberiza spodocephala
Chestnut bunting, Emberiza rutila (A)
Yellow-browed bunting, Emberiza chrysophrys
Tristram's bunting, Emberiza tristrami
Gray bunting, Emberiza variabilis (A)

New World sparrows
Order: PasseriformesFamily: Passerellidae

Until 2017, these species were considered part of the family Emberizidae. Most of the species are known as sparrows, but these birds are not closely related to the Old World sparrows which are in the family Passeridae. Many of these have distinctive head patterns.

Savannah sparrow, Passerculus sandwichensis (A)

See also
List of birds
Lists of birds by region

References

Taiwan
Taiwan

Birds